Halegrapha is a genus of lichen-forming fungi in the family Graphidaceae. It has nine species. The genus was circumscribed in 2011 by Eimy Rivas Plata and Robert Lücking, with Halegrapha chimaera assigned as the type species. The generic name honors American lichenologist Mason Hale.

Halegrapha species generally resemble those in the script lichen genus Graphis, but are distinguished by having a hymenium and ascospores similar to those of genus Phaeographis.

Species
Halegrapha chimaera  – Philippines
Halegrapha floridana  – Florida
Halegrapha intergrapha  – Malaysia
Halegrapha kenyana  – Kenya
Halegrapha masoniana  – Sri Lanka
Halegrapha mexicana  – Mexico
Halegrapha mucronata  – Australia
Halegrapha paulseniana  – Hawaii
Halegrapha yakushimensis  – Japan

References

Graphidaceae
Ostropales genera
Lichen genera
Taxa described in 2011
Taxa named by Robert Lücking